Babilonia is a 1987  Argentine drama film directed and written by Jorge Salvador based on a play by Armando Discépolo.

Release
The film premiered in Argentina in August 1987.

Cast
 Ricardo Bertone
 Raúl Escobar
 Isabel Brunello
 Graciela Castro
 César Carducci
 Victor Moll
 Esther Fernández
 Jani Bonetto
 Chiochi Cardarelli
 Guillermo Lombardi
 Cecilia Flores

External links
 

1987 films
1980s Spanish-language films
1987 drama films
Argentine drama films
1980s Argentine films